Biro Funk is the debut studio album by Braintax, released on Low Life Records in 2001. By the time of the album's release, Braintax was a solo artist - Joseph Christie. Prior to the release of Biro Funk, Braintax had released a number of EPs and 12" singles, originally as a two-piece band. The album was recorded at Christie's own Low Life Records studio in Shepherd's Bush. It features guest appearances from other stars of UK hip hop and scratches performed by DJ Harry Love of the Scratch Perverts.

In the long writing process for this album, Christie recorded over 40 tracks, most of which were dismissed and only the strongest made the final cut.

Track listing
 Don't Drag Me In (featuring Mystro)
 Opening Titles (featuring Skinnyman)
 Futureghost 
 Godnose (featuring Task Force)
 Last Date 
 Speak Your Mind 
 Biro Funk
 Cobblestones 
 The Grip 
 Peace 
 Oceans 
 Escuchame 
 Riviera Hustle (featuring Jehst) 
 Exit

References

2001 debut albums
Braintax albums